Tika is an extinct genus of sphenodontian from the Late Cretaceous Candeleros Formation of Argentina. The type species is Tika giacchinoi. It is considered to be closely related to the tuatara, (Sphenodon punctatus), and a member of the Sphenodontinae. It is the oldest member of Sphenodontinae known from South America.

References 

Sphenodontia
Fossil taxa described in 2021
Cretaceous Argentina